Pyrénées-Orientales, also known as Northern Catalonia, is a department of the region of Occitania, Southern France, adjacent to the northern Spanish frontier and the Mediterranean Sea. It also surrounds the tiny Spanish exclave of Llívia, and thus has two distinct borders with Spain. In 2019, it had a population of 479,979. Some parts of the Pyrénées-Orientales (like the Cerdagne) are part of the Iberian Peninsula. It is named after the Pyrenees mountain range.

History

Prior to the Treaty of the Pyrenees in 1659, most of the present department was part of the former Principality of Catalonia, within the Crown of Aragon, therefore part of the Kingdom of Spain, so the majority of it has historically been Catalan-speaking, and it is still referred to as Northern Catalonia.

The modern department was created early during the French Revolution on 9 February 1790 under the name of Roussillon, also the name of the pre-Revolutionary province of Roussillon to which it almost exactly corresponds, although the department also includes Fenouillèdes, a small piece of territory which had formerly been on the southern edge of Languedoc. The name therefore changed on February 26, 1790, to Pyrénées-Orientales.

Invaded by Spain in April 1793, the area was recaptured thirteen months later during the War of the Roussillon.

During the nineteenth century, Pyrénées-Orientales proved one of the most consistently republican departments in France. The intellectual and republican politician François Arago, who, during the early months of the short-lived Second Republic in 1848, was briefly de facto Head of state, came from Estagel in the east of the department.

Geography

Pyrénées-Orientales has an area of 4,115 km2. It consists of three river valleys in the Pyrenees mountain range –from north to south, those of the Agly, Têt and Tech – and the eastern Plain of Roussillon into which they converge. Most of the population and agricultural production are concentrated in the plain, with only 30% of the area. There is one water reservoir at Lac de Matemale. There is also a lake, Casteilla.

The upper Têt valley comprises the departments westernmost third, with just over a tenth of the total population. To the south-east, the Tech valley and the Côte Vermeille contain nearly 100,000 inhabitants. The Agly basin in the north-east has much in common with neighboring areas of Aude.  Llívia is a town of Cerdanya, province of Girona, Catalonia, Spain, that forms a Spanish exclave surrounded by French territory.

Principal towns

The most populous commune is Perpignan, the prefecture, home to about a quarter of the inhabitants of Pyrénées-Orientales. As of 2019, there are 7 communes with more than 10,000 inhabitants:

They are followed in decreasing order by Pia, Elne, Rivesaltes, Thuir, Céret, Le Soler, Bompas, Toulouges, Canohès and Prades, each of 6–10,000 inhabitants.

Economy
Pyrénées-Orientales is a wine-growing area and a tourist destination.

Demographics
Population development since 1793:French is spoken by almost the entire population. Minority languages in the region are Catalan and Occitan, which between them are estimated to be spoken by 34% of the population and understood by an additional 21%.

On 10 December 2007, the Departmental Council of Pyrénées-Orientales recognized Catalan as a regional language of the department, though French is still the only official language in France, according to the Constitution.

The area is traditionally divided into comarques, of which five (French Cerdagne, Capcir, Conflent, Roussillon and Vallespir) are historically Catalan-speaking and one (Fenouillèdes) is historically Occitan-speaking. The five Catalan-speaking comarques were historically part of the Kingdom of Majorca.

Administration

The département is managed by the Departmental Council of Pyrénées-Orientales in Perpignan. The Pyrénées-Orientales is part of the region of Occitanie. The Departmental Council of Pyrénées-Orientales is more and more involved with the European Union to create, together with the Generalitat of Catalonia and Andorra, a Eurodistrict.

Politics

Departmental Council of Pyrénées-Orientales
The Departmental Council of Pyrénées-Orientales has 34 seats. In the 2015 departmental elections, the Socialist Party (PS) won 17 seats, The Republicans (LR) won 12 seats and the French Communist Party (PCF) won 5 seats. Hermeline Malherbe-Laurent (PS) has been President of the Departmental Council since 2010.

Members of the National Assembly
Pyrénées-Orientales elected the following members of the National Assembly during the 2022 legislative election:

Cuisine
The cuisine of Pyrénées-Orientales draws naturally from the historical Catalan presence in the area, so dishes like paella, caragols a la llauna and calçots are prevalent in the restaurants, especially at important dates such as the various saints' feast days and cultural festivals.

The area is famous for its wine with the predominantly red grape varieties grown all over the department, regional specialities such as muscat de Rivesaltes and Banyuls are sold everywhere in the department.

The geography of the area leads to a distinct divide in the cuisine of P-O. The mountainous area to the south has dishes using ingredients that grow naturally there, products such as olives and goat's cheese.

Fish are also very popular in the region with Collioure being famous for its anchovies, although fishing has declined due to the overall reduction of the fish stock in the Mediterranean sea.

Culture
Places of interest include:
 Banyuls-sur-Mer, famous for its Grenache-based Banyuls wine, birthplace of Aristide Maillol.
 Céret, considered to be one of the birthplaces of cubism, hosts several museums among which the Musée d'Art Moderne.
 Collioure, considered to be one of the famous places of fauvism.
 Força Réal, ruined mountaintop fortress.
 Prades, site of the Catalan Summer University (Universitat Catalana d'Estiu).
 Prats de Mollo, important defensive castle of the 17th century facing south to the Pyrenees.
 Salses, important defensive castle of the 16th century, on the ancient frontier with Spain.

Pyrénées-Orientales has two notable sports teams: USA Perpignan (rugby union) and Catalans Dragons (rugby league).

See also

 Intercommunalities of the Pyrénées-Orientales department

Bibliography

References

External links

  Departmental Council of Pyrénées-Orientales
  Prefecture website
  Photography Panoramics 360° website
(in English) News and tourist information website

 
Northern Catalonia
1790 establishments in France
Departments of Occitania (administrative region)
States and territories established in 1790